is an underground metro station located in Mizuho-ku, Nagoya, Aichi Prefecture, Japan operated by the Nagoya Municipal Subway's Meijō Line. It is located 18.5 kilometers from the terminus of the Meijō Line at Kanayama Station.

History
Sōgō Rihabiri Center Station was opened on 6 October 2004.

Lines

 (Station number: M21)

Layout
Sōgō Rihabiri Center Station has one underground island platform.

Platforms

References

External links
  Sōgō Rihabiri Center Station official web site 

Railway stations in Japan opened in 2004
Railway stations in Aichi Prefecture